Bim Bam Boom was a Canadian children's television series which aired on CBC Television between November 18, 1955 and January 13, 1956. The show featured three clowns, named Bim, Bam and Boom, who told fairy tales and performed. The clown Boom was a human actor played by John Allen. Bim and Bam were puppets controlled by Kitty Dutcher and voiced by Rosemary Malkin and Sam Payne.

External links 
 Queen's University Directory of CBC Television Series (Bim Bam Boom archived listing link via archive.org)
 Bim Bam Boom at the Canadian Communications Foundation
 

1955 Canadian television series debuts
1956 Canadian television series endings
CBC Television original programming
1950s Canadian children's television series
Canadian television shows featuring puppetry
Black-and-white Canadian television shows
Television shows filmed in Vancouver
Television shows about clowns